William Oliver Stevens (October 7, 1878 - January 15, 1955) was an American writer and Professor for the United States Naval Academy.

Stevens was born in Yangon. His grandfather was Francis Mason a famous missionary. He moved to the United States and graduated from Colby College in 1899 with a B.A. in English literature. In 1903 he received a Ph.D. from Yale University.

He taught at the United States Naval Academy (1905-1924) as Senior Professor and Executive of the English Department.

Stevens was also interested in ghost hunting and psychical research.

Publications
 Nantucket: The Far-Away Island (1936)
 Charleston: Historic City of Gardens (1939)
 Discovering Long Island (1939)
 Pistols at Ten Paces  (1940)
 Washington, the Cinderella City (1943)
 Unbidden Guests: A Book of Real Ghosts (1945)
 A History of Sea Power (1947)
 The Mystery of Dreams (1949)
 Psychics and Common Sense'' (1953)

References

External link

1878 births
1955 deaths
American non-fiction writers
Parapsychologists
United States Naval Academy alumni
Expatriates from the United States in British Burma